The Roman Catholic Diocese of Charlottetown is a diocese of the Catholic Church in Canada. It is a suffragan diocese comprising the entire province of Prince Edward Island.

Originally carved from the Archdiocese of Quebec on August 11, 1829, it was then transferred to the Archdiocese of Halifax–Yarmouth on May 4, 1852. It is the second-oldest English-speaking diocese in Canada.

Its seat is the Cathedral-Basilica of Saint Dunstan, located in downtown Charlottetown.

History

Early history
Then known as Île Saint-Jean, the island was initially part of the vast Diocese of Quebec. In the spring of 1721, René-Charles de Breslay and Marie-Anselme de Metivier, priests of the Society of Saint Sulpice, arrived at the Acadian settlement of Port-LaJoye and built a small church dedicated to Saint John the Evangelist. It was then handed-over to Franciscans priests from Louisbourg (in modern-day Nova Scotia) two years later.

By 1752, four more small parishes were then established. In 1758, however, following the Île Saint-Jean campaign, British authorities expelled the Acadians.

Scottish immigration and establishment
Roughly three years after separation from Nova Scotia and becoming its own colony, a further expansion of the Church on now-renamed Saint John's Island began in 1772, when the first band of about 200 Scottish Catholic immigrants set foot, led by the layman John MacDonald of Glenaladale. The idea was conceived and the financed by two bishops of the Scottish Catholic Church — John MacDonald and George Hay — in order to relieve the persecution of Catholics on Uist. They were accompanied by James MacDonald, a cousin of John of Glenaladale. MacDonald was well-suited for the assignment, as he was fluent in Gaelic, English, Latin, and French.

Another group of Scots settled in 1790, led by Angus MacEachern, to join their families who had migrated earlier. MacEachern was fluent in English, French, and Gaelic. He traveled extensively throughout the Maritimes as a missionary. He built the original Saint Dunstan's in 1816. MacEachern served as an auxiliary bishop of Quebec from 1821 until 1829, when he became the first-ever Bishop of Charlottetown.

Split and transfer to new metropolitan see
On September 30, 1842, the diocese was then split off when the new Diocese of Saint John in New Brunswick was created. Ten years later, on May 4, 1852, the diocese was officially transferred to the recently elevated Archdiocese of Halifax (now Halifax–Yarmouth).

Education

Saint Dunstan's University

In 1831, MacEachern established Saint Andrew's College. Although it was closed down by Bernard Donald Macdonald in 1844, he also supervised the construction of Saint Dunstan's College in Charlottetown in 1848 and its eventual opening on January 15, 1855. It was built to respond to the needs of Catholic students on the Island, as opposed to Prince of Wales College, which was a majority-Protestant public institution.

In 1969, as part of the Prince Edward Island Comprehensive Development Plan designed by the government of then-premier Alex Campbell, the two schools amalgamated to form the University of Prince Edward Island.

Healthcare

Charlottetown Hospital was established in 1879, under the leadership of Peter McIntyre. It was the first hospital in Charlottetown.

In 1982, after 102 years of service, the Charlottetown Hospital finally closed its doors when the newly opened Queen Elizabeth Hospital on Riverside Drive opened. The campus that once stood on Haviland Street is now the Tourism and Culinary Centre of Holland College.

Community

Priests
, there are a total of 40 priests (39 diocesan and 1 religious) serving within the jurisdiction of the diocese.

Most of them are in the 52 parishes, but there are also others without a parish, carrying out diocesan or apostolate tasks. Some are outside the diocese, either on study-leave, on mission, working in other dioceses, or on-leave from the ministry, and some are retired.

There used to be three (3) male religious congregations serving the diocese over the course of more than a century, before the last congregation finally left the Island:

 Brothers of the Christian Schools (F.C.S.) (1870–1877)
 Society of Jesus (S.J.) (1880–1881)
 Congregation of the Most Holy Redeemer (C.Ss.R.) (1929–1975)

Nuns
Today, there are three (3) religious institutes of women in the diocese, although there also have been six (6) others that formerly served the Island over the course of more than a century.

Current
 Congregation of Notre Dame of Montreal (C.N.D.) (1857–present)
 Sisters of Saint Martha (C.S.M.) (1916–present)
 Sisters of the Sacred Heart of Jesus of Ragusa (S.S.C.) (2018–present)

Past
 Sisters of Charity of Montreal (S.G.M.) (1879–1925)
 Filles de Jésus (F.J.) (1903–1909)
 Little Sisters of the Holy Family (P.S.S.F.) (1909–1916)
 Sisters of the Precious Blood (R.P.B.) (1929–2012)
 Notre-Dame-du-Sacré-Coeur (N.D.S.C.) (1959–1979)
 Servantes du Saint Cœur de Marie (S.S.C.M.) (1977–1989)

Ordinaries

Diocesan Bishops

Affiliated Bishops
 Joseph Faber MacDonald† – Bishop of Grand Falls, Newfoundland and Labrador

See also
 Prince Edward Island
 Charlottetown
 Catholic Church in Canada
List of Catholic dioceses in Canada

References

External links
 
 
 
 Diocese of Charlottetown – Catholic Hierarchy

Charlottetown
Catholic Church in Prince Edward Island
Organizations based in Charlottetown
Charlottetown
Charlottetown
1829 establishments in Prince Edward Island